The 2018–19 Weber State Wildcats women's basketball team represents Weber State University during the 2018–19 NCAA Division I women's basketball season. The Wildcats are led by first year head coach Bethann Ord and play their home games at the Dee Events Center. They are members of the Big Sky Conference.

Radio Broadcasts
All Wildcats games are heard on KWCR with Nick Bailey calling the action. All home games and conference road games are also streamed with video live online through Watch Big Sky .

Roster

Schedule

|-
!colspan=9 style=| Exhibition

|-
!colspan=9 style=| Non-conference regular season

|-
!colspan=9 style=| Big Sky regular season

|-
!colspan=9 style=| Big Sky Women's Tournament

See also
2018–19 Weber State Wildcats men's basketball team

References

Weber State Wildcats women's basketball seasons
Weber State